The 2002–03 Carolina Hurricanes season was the franchise's 24th season in the National Hockey League and sixth as the Hurricanes. The Hurricanes missed the playoffs, despite making it to the Stanley Cup Finals the previous year, finishing the season with an NHL-worst record of 22–43–11–6 (61 points).

Offseason

Regular season
The Hurricanes finished 30th in scoring, with just 171 goals for. They also had the most power-play opportunities of all 30 teams, with 420.

Final standings

Schedule and results

|- align="center" bgcolor="#FFBBBB"
|1||L||October 9, 2002||1–4 || align="left"|  New York Rangers (2002–03) ||0–1–0–0 || 18,730 || 
|- align="center" bgcolor="#CCFFCC" 
|2||W||October 11, 2002||5–3 || align="left"|  Atlanta Thrashers (2002–03) ||1–1–0–0 || 13,962 || 
|- align="center" bgcolor="#FFBBBB"
|3||L||October 12, 2002||1–5 || align="left"| @ Tampa Bay Lightning (2002–03) ||1–2–0–0 || 19,814 || 
|- align="center" bgcolor="#FF6F6F"
|4||OTL||October 15, 2002||1–2 OT|| align="left"| @ St. Louis Blues (2002–03) ||1–2–0–1 || 13,222 || 
|- align="center" bgcolor="#FFBBBB"
|5||L||October 17, 2002||1–2 || align="left"|  Washington Capitals (2002–03) ||1–3–0–1 || 10,597 || 
|- align="center" bgcolor="#CCFFCC" 
|6||W||October 19, 2002||3–1 || align="left"|  New Jersey Devils (2002–03) ||2–3–0–1 || 15,518 || 
|- align="center" bgcolor="#CCFFCC" 
|7||W||October 22, 2002||4–1 || align="left"| @ New York Islanders (2002–03) ||3–3–0–1 || 13,514 || 
|- align="center" bgcolor="#FFBBBB"
|8||L||October 23, 2002||1–4 || align="left"| @ Ottawa Senators (2002–03) ||3–4–0–1 || 14,847 || 
|- align="center" 
|9||T||October 26, 2002||3–3 OT|| align="left"|  Chicago Blackhawks (2002–03) ||3–4–1–1 || 15,613 || 
|- align="center" bgcolor="#CCFFCC" 
|10||W||October 29, 2002||2–1 || align="left"| @ New Jersey Devils (2002–03) ||4–4–1–1 || 10,328 || 
|- align="center" bgcolor="#CCFFCC" 
|11||W||October 30, 2002||4–2 || align="left"|  New York Islanders (2002–03) ||5–4–1–1 || 12,495 || 
|-

|- align="center" 
|12||T||November 1, 2002||2–2 OT|| align="left"|  Montreal Canadiens (2002–03) ||5–4–2–1 || 15,357 || 
|- align="center" bgcolor="#FF6F6F"
|13||OTL||November 5, 2002||1–2 OT|| align="left"|  Philadelphia Flyers (2002–03) ||5–4–2–2 || 15,501 || 
|- align="center" bgcolor="#CCFFCC" 
|14||W||November 7, 2002||2–0 || align="left"|  Buffalo Sabres (2002–03) ||6–4–2–2 || 11,588 || 
|- align="center" bgcolor="#CCFFCC" 
|15||W||November 9, 2002||3–2 || align="left"|  Pittsburgh Penguins (2002–03) ||7–4–2–2 || 18,730 || 
|- align="center" bgcolor="#CCFFCC" 
|16||W||November 12, 2002||3–2 || align="left"|  Phoenix Coyotes (2002–03) ||8–4–2–2 || 10,707 || 
|- align="center" 
|17||T||November 15, 2002||1–1 OT|| align="left"|  Philadelphia Flyers (2002–03) ||8–4–3–2 || 17,480 || 
|- align="center" bgcolor="#FF6F6F"
|18||OTL||November 17, 2002||1–2 OT|| align="left"|  Tampa Bay Lightning (2002–03) ||8–4–3–3 || 13,970 || 
|- align="center" 
|19||T||November 19, 2002||4–4 OT|| align="left"|  Ottawa Senators (2002–03) ||8–4–4–3 || 11,044 || 
|- align="center" bgcolor="#FFBBBB"
|20||L||November 21, 2002||1–3 || align="left"| @ Boston Bruins (2002–03) ||8–5–4–3 || 10,667 || 
|- align="center" bgcolor="#CCFFCC" 
|21||W||November 23, 2002||7–3 || align="left"| @ Montreal Canadiens (2002–03) ||9–5–4–3 || 20,420 || 
|- align="center" bgcolor="#FFBBBB"
|22||L||November 25, 2002||1–3 || align="left"| @ New York Rangers (2002–03) ||9–6–4–3 || 18,200 || 
|- align="center" bgcolor="#FFBBBB"
|23||L||November 27, 2002||2–3 || align="left"|  Vancouver Canucks (2002–03) ||9–7–4–3 || 14,943 || 
|- align="center" bgcolor="#CCFFCC" 
|24||W||November 29, 2002||6–4 || align="left"|  Detroit Red Wings (2002–03) ||10–7–4–3 || 18,730 || 
|- align="center" bgcolor="#CCFFCC" 
|25||W||November 30, 2002||4–2 || align="left"| @ Columbus Blue Jackets (2002–03) ||11–7–4–3 || 18,136 || 
|-

|- align="center" bgcolor="#CCFFCC" 
|26||W||December 3, 2002||2–1 || align="left"| @ Nashville Predators (2002–03) ||12–7–4–3 || 10,258 || 
|- align="center" bgcolor="#FFBBBB"
|27||L||December 4, 2002||2–4 || align="left"| @ Florida Panthers (2002–03) ||12–8–4–3 || 10,944 || 
|- align="center" bgcolor="#FFBBBB"
|28||L||December 6, 2002||0–2 || align="left"|  Florida Panthers (2002–03) ||12–9–4–3 || 17,006 || 
|- align="center" bgcolor="#FFBBBB"
|29||L||December 7, 2002||2–5 || align="left"| @ Ottawa Senators (2002–03) ||12–10–4–3 || 15,328 || 
|- align="center" bgcolor="#FFBBBB"
|30||L||December 11, 2002||1–4 || align="left"| @ Edmonton Oilers (2002–03) ||12–11–4–3 || 16,091 || 
|- align="center" bgcolor="#CCFFCC" 
|31||W||December 12, 2002||4–3 || align="left"| @ Calgary Flames (2002–03) ||13–11–4–3 || 14,528 || 
|- align="center" bgcolor="#FFBBBB"
|32||L||December 15, 2002||1–2 || align="left"| @ Minnesota Wild (2002–03) ||13–12–4–3 || 18,568 || 
|- align="center" 
|33||T||December 18, 2002||1–1 OT|| align="left"|  Tampa Bay Lightning (2002–03) ||13–12–5–3 || 15,236 || 
|- align="center" bgcolor="#CCFFCC" 
|34||W||December 20, 2002||3–2 OT|| align="left"| @ Atlanta Thrashers (2002–03) ||14–12–5–3 || 12,831 || 
|- align="center" bgcolor="#CCFFCC" 
|35||W||December 22, 2002||1–0 || align="left"|  Dallas Stars (2002–03) ||15–12–5–3 || 17,127 || 
|- align="center" bgcolor="#FFBBBB"
|36||L||December 27, 2002||3–5 || align="left"|  Atlanta Thrashers (2002–03) ||15–13–5–3 || 18,730 || 
|- align="center" bgcolor="#FFBBBB"
|37||L||December 28, 2002||0–3 || align="left"| @ New York Islanders (2002–03) ||15–14–5–3 || 15,559 || 
|- align="center" bgcolor="#FFBBBB"
|38||L||December 31, 2002||0–2 || align="left"|  New York Rangers (2002–03) ||15–15–5–3 || 18,730 || 
|-

|- align="center" bgcolor="#FFBBBB"
|39||L||January 3, 2003||3–6 || align="left"| @ Buffalo Sabres (2002–03) ||15–16–5–3 || 13,757 || 
|- align="center" bgcolor="#CCFFCC" 
|40||W||January 4, 2003||4–2 || align="left"| @ Boston Bruins (2002–03) ||16–16–5–3 || 16,407 || 
|- align="center" 
|41||T||January 7, 2003||3–3 OT|| align="left"| @ Atlanta Thrashers (2002–03) ||16–16–6–3 || 9,061 || 
|- align="center" bgcolor="#FFBBBB"
|42||L||January 8, 2003||1–5 || align="left"| @ New York Rangers (2002–03) ||16–17–6–3 || 18,200 || 
|- align="center" bgcolor="#FFBBBB"
|43||L||January 10, 2003||1–4 || align="left"|  Washington Capitals (2002–03) ||16–18–6–3 || 16,553 || 
|- align="center" bgcolor="#FF6F6F"
|44||OTL||January 12, 2003||2–3 OT|| align="left"|  Colorado Avalanche (2002–03) ||16–18–6–4 || 18,730 || 
|- align="center" bgcolor="#FFBBBB"
|45||L||January 15, 2003||0–2 || align="left"|  Pittsburgh Penguins (2002–03) ||16–19–6–4 || 15,265 || 
|- align="center" bgcolor="#FFBBBB"
|46||L||January 17, 2003||1–2 || align="left"|  New Jersey Devils (2002–03) ||16–20–6–4 || 18,730 || 
|- align="center" bgcolor="#FFBBBB"
|47||L||January 18, 2003||2–5 || align="left"| @ New Jersey Devils (2002–03) ||16–21–6–4 || 17,574 || 
|- align="center" bgcolor="#FFBBBB"
|48||L||January 20, 2003||3–5 || align="left"|  St. Louis Blues (2002–03) ||16–22–6–4 || 14,654 || 
|- align="center" bgcolor="#FFBBBB"
|49||L||January 22, 2003||3–5 || align="left"| @ Washington Capitals (2002–03) ||16–23–6–4 || 12,954 || 
|- align="center" bgcolor="#CCFFCC" 
|50||W||January 24, 2003||3–1 || align="left"|  Florida Panthers (2002–03) ||17–23–6–4 || 15,346 || 
|- align="center" bgcolor="#FF6F6F"
|51||OTL||January 25, 2003||2–3 OT|| align="left"| @ Florida Panthers (2002–03) ||17–23–6–5 || 16,122 || 
|- align="center" bgcolor="#FFBBBB"
|52||L||January 29, 2003||2–3 || align="left"|  Toronto Maple Leafs (2002–03) ||17–24–6–5 || 18,094 || 
|- align="center" bgcolor="#FFBBBB"
|53||L||January 30, 2003||1–3 || align="left"| @ Tampa Bay Lightning (2002–03) ||17–25–6–5 || 13,541 || 
|-

|- align="center" bgcolor="#FFBBBB"
|54||L||February 5, 2003||2–6 || align="left"| @ San Jose Sharks (2002–03) ||17–26–6–5 || 17,108 || 
|- align="center" bgcolor="#FFBBBB"
|55||L||February 7, 2003||2–8 || align="left"| @ Los Angeles Kings (2002–03) ||17–27–6–5 || 18,118 || 
|- align="center" bgcolor="#FFBBBB"
|56||L||February 9, 2003||1–2 || align="left"| @ Mighty Ducks of Anaheim (2002–03) ||17–28–6–5 || 15,599 || 
|- align="center" bgcolor="#FF6F6F"
|57||OTL||February 11, 2003||1–2 OT|| align="left"| @ Dallas Stars (2002–03) ||17–28–6–6 || 18,532 || 
|- align="center" bgcolor="#CCFFCC" 
|58||W||February 14, 2003||3–1 || align="left"|  Washington Capitals (2002–03) ||18–28–6–6 || 17,003 || 
|- align="center" 
|59||T||February 15, 2003||2–2 OT|| align="left"| @ Philadelphia Flyers (2002–03) ||18–28–7–6 || 19,408 || 
|- align="center" bgcolor="#FFBBBB"
|60||L||February 18, 2003||3–4 || align="left"| @ Toronto Maple Leafs (2002–03) ||18–29–7–6 || 19,365 || 
|- align="center" 
|61||T||February 19, 2003||1–1 OT|| align="left"|  Boston Bruins (2002–03) ||18–29–8–6 || 16,194 || 
|- align="center" 
|62||T||February 21, 2003||2–2 OT|| align="left"|  Tampa Bay Lightning (2002–03) ||18–29–9–6 || 16,732 || 
|- align="center" bgcolor="#FFBBBB"
|63||L||February 23, 2003||0–4 || align="left"|  Mighty Ducks of Anaheim (2002–03) ||18–30–9–6 || 15,053 || 
|- align="center" bgcolor="#FFBBBB"
|64||L||February 26, 2003||2–4 || align="left"| @ Phoenix Coyotes (2002–03) ||18–31–9–6 || 12,168 || 
|-

|- align="center" bgcolor="#FFBBBB"
|65||L||March 1, 2003||1–4 || align="left"| @ Toronto Maple Leafs (2002–03) ||18–32–9–6 || 19,362 || 
|- align="center" bgcolor="#FFBBBB"
|66||L||March 2, 2003||0–2 || align="left"| @ Washington Capitals (2002–03) ||18–33–9–6 || 16,198 || 
|- align="center" bgcolor="#FFBBBB"
|67||L||March 4, 2003||2–4 || align="left"|  Boston Bruins (2002–03) ||18–34–9–6 || 14,973 || 
|- align="center" bgcolor="#CCFFCC" 
|68||W||March 6, 2003||4–0 || align="left"| @ Pittsburgh Penguins (2002–03) ||19–34–9–6 || 14,812 || 
|- align="center" bgcolor="#CCFFCC" 
|69||W||March 7, 2003||1–0 || align="left"|  Minnesota Wild (2002–03) ||20–34–9–6 || 13,224 || 
|- align="center" bgcolor="#CCFFCC" 
|70||W||March 10, 2003||6–5 || align="left"|  Columbus Blue Jackets (2002–03) ||21–34–9–6 || 13,066 || 
|- align="center" bgcolor="#CCFFCC" 
|71||W||March 12, 2003||3–2 OT|| align="left"| @ Buffalo Sabres (2002–03) ||22–34–9–6 || 15,425 || 
|- align="center" bgcolor="#FFBBBB"
|72||L||March 13, 2003||3–5 || align="left"| @ Philadelphia Flyers (2002–03) ||22–35–9–6 || 19,399 || 
|- align="center" 
|73||T||March 15, 2003||0–0 OT|| align="left"|  Los Angeles Kings (2002–03) ||22–35–10–6 || 16,017 || 
|- align="center" bgcolor="#FFBBBB"
|74||L||March 18, 2003||5–6 || align="left"|  Ottawa Senators (2002–03) ||22–36–10–6 || 16,531 || 
|- align="center" bgcolor="#FFBBBB"
|75||L||March 22, 2003||3–5 || align="left"| @ Montreal Canadiens (2002–03) ||22–37–10–6 || 21,273 || 
|- align="center" 
|76||T||March 25, 2003||3–3 OT|| align="left"|  Toronto Maple Leafs (2002–03) ||22–37–11–6 || 16,262 || 
|- align="center" bgcolor="#FFBBBB"
|77||L||March 26, 2003||1–5 || align="left"| @ Atlanta Thrashers (2002–03) ||22–38–11–6 || 9,994 || 
|- align="center" bgcolor="#FFBBBB"
|78||L||March 29, 2003||1–3 || align="left"|  Buffalo Sabres (2002–03) ||22–39–11–6 || 17,677 || 
|- align="center" bgcolor="#FFBBBB"
|79||L||March 31, 2003||0–4 || align="left"|  Montreal Canadiens (2002–03) ||22–40–11–6 || 14,157 || 
|-

|- align="center" bgcolor="#FFBBBB"
|80||L||April 2, 2003||2–3 || align="left"| @ Pittsburgh Penguins (2002–03) ||22–41–11–6 || 15,718 || 
|- align="center" bgcolor="#FFBBBB"
|81||L||April 4, 2003||1–4 || align="left"| @ Florida Panthers (2002–03) ||22–42–11–6 || 16,544 || 
|- align="center" bgcolor="#FFBBBB"
|82||L||April 6, 2003||1–2 || align="left"|  New York Islanders (2002–03) ||22–43–11–6 || 16,918 || 
|-

|-
| Legend:

Player statistics

Scoring
 Position abbreviations: C = Center; D = Defense; G = Goaltender; LW = Left Wing; RW = Right Wing
  = Joined team via a transaction (e.g., trade, waivers, signing) during the season. Stats reflect time with the Hurricanes only.
  = Left team via a transaction (e.g., trade, waivers, release) during the season. Stats reflect time with the Hurricanes only.

Goaltending
  = Joined team via a transaction (e.g., trade, waivers, signing) during the season. Stats reflect time with the Hurricanes only.

Awards and records

Awards

Milestones

Transactions
The Hurricanes were involved in the following transactions from June 14, 2002, the day after the deciding game of the 2002 Stanley Cup Finals, through June 9, 2003, the day of the deciding game of the 2003 Stanley Cup Finals.

Trades

Players acquired

Players lost

Signings

Draft picks
Carolina's picks at the 2002 NHL Entry Draft in Toronto, Ontario, Canada.

Farm teams

American Hockey League

The Lowell Lock Monsters are the Hurricanes American Hockey League affiliate for the 2002–03 AHL season.

East Coast Hockey League
The Florida Everblades are the Hurricanes East Coast Hockey League affiliate.

Notes

References

Carol
Carol
Carolina Hurricanes seasons
Hurr
Hurr